Upeksha Swarnamali, popularly known as "Paba", is an actress in Sri Lankan cinema and television and a former member of the Sri Lanka Parliament. She gained popularity for her role on the television series "Paba" broadcast on Independent Television Network.

Personal life
She was born to Sri Lankan parents in Kuwait, where she lived for 20 years before returning to Sri Lanka in 2004. She studied at Indian International School in Kuwait and holds a Diploma in Dancing. Her mother named Nirmalee Swarnamali and her father is a Tamil citizen. She said that she never know about her dad due to parents divorced where she was 4 years old. Swarnamali has a brother from another mother named J. Shehan Fernando.

Swarnamali was first married to Mahesh Chaminda, but she was assaulted by him and was hospitalised with heavy bruises and other injuries. They divorced on 31 January 2013, by a court order from Colombo District Court. She then married car sale owner Samantha Perera on 13 March 2016 and the couple has one daughter.

Acting
Starting her career as a model, she appeared on several song videos including "Chanchala", and took a major role in the television drama series Paba. She also participated in the reality dancing show Sirasa Dancing Stars, but was eliminated on 8 June 2008. She won the Sumathi Award for Best Upcoming Actress for Most popular actress sponsored by Vendol. In 2008, she acted in Sri Lanka's first gigital movie, Hetawath Mata Adaraya Karanna. The film was telecast on Valentine's Day 2008 through Citi Hitz Satellite movie channel of Dialog Television. During the shooting of the teledrama Ahas Maliga, she was bitten by a cobra, but nothing serious due to removal of fangs.

Selected television serials
 Aganthukaya
 Ahas Maliga
 Bindunu Sith
 Dekada Kada
 Oba Nisa
 Paba
 Samanalunta Wedithiyanna

Politics
She gained national attention due to the controversial removal from the Paba teledrama aired by State run ITN, due to what she claimed as her open support for then opposition presidential candidate (General Sarath Fonseka).

She was elected as a member of the Sri Lanka Parliament in the 2010 General Elections held on 8 April 2010 representing the United National Party having obtained 81350 preferential votes being the second from Gampaha District UNP list. In June 2010, she steered controversy over an interview she gave on Derana TV. The interview caused great embarrassment to herself as well as the Sri Lankan public. Later she admitted that she lacked political knowledge and had no knowledge about Sri Lankan constitution.

She supported the governing United People's Freedom Alliance voting for the 18th amendment to the constitution and crossing over. After that she joined Sri Lanka Freedom Party. Swarnamali retired from active politics in 2015.

Appearance in reality show Mega Star 
She took part as a contestant in the Mega Star reality program organized by Swarnavahini, a leading TV broadcast station of Sri Lanka. She made it to the four finalists and was voted the 4th in the Mega Star finals.

Monitoring Minister 
MP Upeksha Swarnamali was appointed Monitoring Minister of Foreign Employment Promotion and Welfare by President Mahinda Rajapaksa from 2014.

Filmography 
She acted more teledramas than films since her beginning and popularity through teledramas. Her notable film career began with her latest film Cindrella.

References

External links
Parliament profile
Sri Lanka Sinhala Films Database - Upeksha Swarnamali
Upeksha Swarnamali Photo Gallery
Upeksha Swarnamali on SLMDb
Watch Upeksha Swarnamali's teledrama 'Sneha' on pivithuru TV.

1984 births
Living people
Sri Lankan television actresses
Sri Lankan female models
Members of the 14th Parliament of Sri Lanka
Women legislators in Sri Lanka
21st-century Sri Lankan women politicians